João Victor Lima Ferreira (born 25 February 1999) is a Brazilian professional footballer who plays as a winger for Caldense.

Club career
João Victor is a youth product of Red Bull Brasil, and signed with Grêmio Osasco in 2019. He had several loans with Caldense. João Victor made his professional debut with Caldense in a 2-2 Campeonato Mineiro tie with América Mineiro on 23 January 2019. On 18 August 2020, João Victor joined on loan in the Primeira Liga.

Honours
Ituano
Campeonato Brasileiro Série C: 2021

References

External links

1999 births
Living people
Footballers from São Paulo (state)
Brazilian footballers
Association football wingers
Campeonato Brasileiro Série B players
Campeonato Brasileiro Série C players
Campeonato Brasileiro Série D players
Grêmio Esportivo Osasco players
Associação Atlética Caldense players
Associação Atlética Ponte Preta players
Ituano FC players
Associação Portuguesa de Desportos players
Primeira Liga players
C.D. Nacional players
Brazilian expatriate footballers
Brazilian expatriates in Portugal
Expatriate footballers in Portugal